RCB may stand for:

 R Coronae Borealis variable, a type of star
 Ràdio Ciutat de Badalona, Barcelona, Spain
 RCB Bank, Cyprus
 A protein involved in chloroplast biogenesis
 Regional Centre for Biotechnology, India
 Regular Commissions Board, later the British Army Officer Selection Board
 Richards Bay Airport IATA code
 Royal Challengers Bangalore, an Indian IPL franchise